British Rail 15107 was a 0-6-0 diesel-electric shunter locomotive commissioned by the Great Western Railway from its Swindon Works, but delivered to British Railways after nationalisation. It had a Petter 4-cylinder engine. Its shed allocation in 1950 was Western Region, 82B, St Philip's Marsh, Bristol.

Number 15107 had a short life and never acquired a British Railways classification. It was withdrawn in June 1958 and broken up at Swindon.

See also

 British Rail Class D3/14
 GWR diesel shunters
 List of British Rail classes

Sources

 Brush Diesel & Electric Locomotive Works List, re-printed by the Industrial Railway Society in 1999
 Ian Allan ABC of British Railways Locomotives (various dates)
 "Western Region Allocations", pp. 38–39, published in 1953 by the Locomotive Club of Great Britain

 15107
Brush Traction locomotives
C locomotives
Individual locomotives of Great Britain
Railway locomotives introduced in 1949
Scrapped locomotives
Unique locomotives
Standard gauge locomotives of Great Britain
Diesel-electric locomotives of Great Britain